Blend4Web is a free and open source framework for creating and displaying interactive 3D computer graphics in web browsers.

Overview 
The Blend4Web framework leverages Blender to edit 3D scenes. Content rendering relies on WebGL, Web Audio, WebVR, and other web standards, without the use of plug-ins.

It is dual-licensed and is distributed under the free and open source GPLv3 and a non-free license; the source code is hosted on GitHub.

A 3D scene can be prepared in Blender and then exported as a pair of JSON and binary files to load in a web application. It can also be exported as a single, self-contained HTML file, in which exported data, the web player GUI and the engine itself are packed. The HTML option is considered to be the simplest way. The resulting file, which has a minimum size of 1 MB, can be embedded in a web page using a standard iframe HTML element. Blend4Web-powered web applications can be deployed on social networking websites such as Facebook.

The Blend4Web toolchain consists of JavaScript libraries, the Blender add-on, and a set of tools for tweaking 3D scene parameters, debugging, and optimization.

Developed by Moscow-based company Triumph in 2010, Blend4Web was publicly released on March 28, 2014.

At the end of 2017, the project founders Yuri and Alex Kovelenov quit Triumph to start the development of a new WebGL framework Verge3D.

In October 2019, an "Absolutely new Blend4Web" was announced, planned to make developing 3D apps easier and to add a new marketplace where people can offer their 3D models.

Features 
The framework has a number of components typically found in game engines, including a positional audio system, physics engine (a fork of Bullet ported to JavaScript), animation system, and an abstraction layer for game logic programming.

Up to 8 different types of animations can be assigned to a single object, including skeletal and per-vertex animation. The speed and the direction of animation (forward/backward play), as well as particle system parameters (size, initial velocity, and count), can be changed through the API.

Among other supported features are scene data dynamic loading and unloading, subsurface scattering simulation, and image-based lighting.

Some out-of-box options exist for rendering extended outdoor environments, including foliage-wind interaction, water, atmosphere, and sunlight simulation. One example demonstrating these effects is "The Farm" tech demo, which also features multiple animated NPCs and the ability to walk, interact with objects and drive a vehicle in first-person mode.

Being based on the cross-browser WebGL API, Blend4Web runs in the majority of web browsers, including mobile ones. There are some caveats for browsers with experimental WebGL support, such as Internet Explorer. There are also applications developed to run on Tizen-powered devices such as the Samsung Gear S2 smartwatch.

Other features include draw call batching, hidden surface determination, threaded physics simulation and ocean simulation.

In version 14.09, Blend4Web introduced the possibility of adding interactivity to 3D scenes using a visual programming tool. The tool is reminiscent of the BGE's logic editor as it uses logic blocks that are placed inside Blender. It plays back animation tracks authored by an artist when the user interacts with predefined 3D objects.

Since version 15.03, Blend4Web has supported attaching HTML elements (such as information windows) to 3D objects ("annotations") and copying objects in run time ("instancing").

The following post-processing effects are supported: glow, bloom, depth of field, crepuscular rays, motion blur, and screen space ambient occlusion.

Virtual reality and augmented reality 

Virtual reality devices have been supported since the end of 2015. Specifically, Oculus Rift head-mounted display works over experimental WebVR API. 

The software also now includes preliminary support for gamepads, based on the Gamepad API.

In 2017, the option to author augmented reality content was added. The system is based on the open-source tracking library ARToolKit and uses the WebRTC protocols.

Starting from version 17.08, finger tracking is supported through the Leap Motion device.

Blender integration 
The Blender add-on is written in Python and C and can be compiled for the Linux x86/x64, OS X x64, and MS Windows x86/x64 platforms.

A Blend4Web-specific profile can be activated in the add-on settings. When switching to this profile, the Blender interface changes so that it only reveals settings relevant to Blend4Web.

Blend4Web supports a set of Blender-specific features such as the node material editor (a tool for visual shader programming) and the particle system. There is basic support for Blender's non-linear animation (NLA) editor for creating simple scenarios.

Blend4Web is based on Blender's real-time GLSL rendering engine, which users are recommended to use in order to enable WYSIWYG editing.

Notable uses 
NASA developed an interactive web application called Experience Curiosity to celebrate the 3rd anniversary of the Curiosity rover landing on Mars. This Blend4Web-based app makes it possible to operate the rover, control its cameras and the robotic arm, and reproduce some of the prominent events of the Mars Science Laboratory mission. The application got presented at the beginning of the WebGL section at SIGGRAPH 2015.

Experience Curiosity was ported to Verge3D for Blender in 2018 with several performance improvements and bug fixes.

A General Motors authorized dealer in the United Arab Emirates has placed a functional Chevrolet Camaro 3D configurator on its website. 

Greenpeace created interactive 3D infographics to back Greenpeace's Detox campaign in Russia. Tallink featured an interactive 3D presentation of its MS Megastar vessel to allow visitors to browse details of the ship.

See also 

 Verge3D
 Blender
 WebGL
 List of WebGL frameworks

References

External links 
 

3D graphics software
3D scenegraph APIs
Cross-platform software
Free 3D graphics software
Game engines for Linux
Graphics libraries
JavaScript libraries
Web development
WebGL